Thou Shalt Not Kill is a 1923 German silent film directed by Fritz Hofbauer and starring Werner Krauss and Emil Jannings.

Cast
 Werner Krauss as Prof. Marquardt
 Julia Terry as Dorrit
 Frl. Ferryda as Ellen
 Emil Jannings as Harold Hilbrich
 Fritz Hofbauer as Konrad Hilbrich
 Hermann Thimig as Fritz

References

Bibliography
 Bock, Hans-Michael & Bergfelder, Tim. The Concise CineGraph. Encyclopedia of German Cinema. Berghahn Books, 2009.

External links

1923 films
Films of the Weimar Republic
German silent feature films
German black-and-white films
1920s German films